Kurdasht-e Olya (also Romanized as Kūrdasht-e ‘Olyā and Kūreh Dasht-e ‘Olyā; also known as Kūrdasht and Kanī Sardeh) is a village in Kuhdasht-e Shomali Rural District, in the Central District of Kuhdasht County, Lorestan Province, Iran. At the 2006 census, its population was 74, in 14 families.

References 

Towns and villages in Kuhdasht County